The 2000 Volvo PGA Championship was the 46th edition of the Volvo PGA Championship, an annual professional golf tournament on the European Tour. It was held 26–29 May at the West Course of Wentworth Club in Virginia Water, Surrey, England, a suburb southwest of London.

Colin Montgomerie won by three strokes over Darren Clarke, Andrew Coltart and Lee Westwood to claim his third consecutive Volvo PGA Championship, a feat that had never been achieved before.

Course layout

Past champions in the field 
Ten former champions entered the tournament.

Made the cut

Missed the cut

Nationalities in the field

Round summaries

First round 
Friday, 26 May 2000

Second round 
Saturday, 27 May 2000

Third round 
Sunday, 28 May 2000

Final round 
Monday, 29 May 2000

Scorecard

Cumulative tournament scores, relative to par

Source:

References 

BMW PGA Championship
Golf tournaments in England
Volvo PGA Championship
Volvo PGA Championship
Volvo PGA Championship